Bredene is a municipality located in the Belgian province of West Flanders. The municipality only comprises the town of Bredene proper. On 1 January 2006, Bredene had a total population of 15,118. The total area is 13.08 km² which gives a population density of 1156 inhabitants per km².

Bredene is situated at the Belgian coast and makes its income mostly out of tourism. In the period of July and August, the population doubles due to many events that attract people from everywhere. Belgium's only nude beach is at  near tram stop "Bredene Renbaan (Hippodroom)".

Notes and references

External links 
 
  - Information available in Dutch and limited information available in French, English and German

 
Municipalities of West Flanders
Nude beaches